Enrique Lores (born 1964/1965) is a Spanish business executive, and the CEO of HP Inc. since November 2019.

Lores was born in Madrid. He earned a bachelor's degree in electrical engineering from the Polytechnic University of Valencia, and an MBA from ESADE Business School in Barcelona.

Lores joined HP as an engineering intern in 1989.

In November 2019, Lores succeeded Dion Weisler as CEO of HP Inc, after he stepped down  due to "a family health matter". Lores had been  president of HP’s imaging, printing and solutions business.

References

Living people
American chief executives of Fortune 500 companies
Hewlett-Packard people
1960s births
ESADE alumni
Technical University of Valencia alumni
People from Madrid